Merete Alfsen (born 14 February 1950) is a Norwegian translator.

Career
Alfsen started working as translator in 1981, and has translated more than ninety books into Norwegian language.

Personal life
Alfsen was born on 14 February 1950, a daughter of engineer Petter Alfsen and Torill Riise-Hansen. She was married to diplomat Terje Rød-Larsen from 1971 to 1982.

Awards 

 1992: Norwegian culture and church department's translator prize for child and youth literature for her translation of John Marsden's So much to tell you [Så mye å si deg]
 1994: Bastian Prize in 1994, for her translation of Virginia Woolf's novel Orlando into Norwegian.
 1997: The Book Club's fiction translator prize [Bokklubbenes skjønnlitterære oversetterpris]
 2006: Bastian Prize for child and youth literature for her translation of William Nicholson's The Wind Singer [Vindsangeren]
 2011: Norwegian Critics Prize for Literature in 2011, for translation of A. S. Byatt's novel The Children's Book into Norwegian langue.
 2016: Norwegian Academy Prize in memory of Thorleif Dahl.

References

1950 births
Living people
Norwegian translators
Norwegian literary critics
Norwegian women non-fiction writers
Women literary critics